Gatcombe is a village on the Isle of Wight, England. 

Gatcombe may also refer to:

Australia 

 Gatcombe, Queensland, a town on Facing Island in the Gladstone Harbour in the Gladstone Region

United Kingdom 

 Gatcombe, Gloucestershire a hamlet in Awre, Gloucestershire, England
 Gatcombe, Somerset, England, a house in Somerset known for its Roman ruins
 Gatcombe Park a house in Gloucestershire, best known as the home of Princess Anne, England